North Howden is a hamlet in the East Riding of Yorkshire, England.
It lies on the B1228 road where it crosses the Hull to York railway line. 

It forms part of the civil parish of Howden.

Since 1840 Howden railway station on the Selby Line has been located here. The station and associated station master's house was designated a Grade II listed building in 1987. The signal box was also designated Grade II in 1989.

References

Hamlets in the East Riding of Yorkshire
Howden